"Glass" is a standalone single released by From Her Eyes on 21 September 2015, being preceded by the band's EP Demons. This also marked the final studio release by the band, disbanding in early 2016.

Production 
After the success of the band's first EP, From Her Eyes continued to develop their sound.   With the addition of guitarist Joe Shutt, the band wanted to introduce heavier elements to their sound indicative of deathcore and  the technicality of progressive metal without abandoning their melodic roots

Whilst still holding melodic elements and consistent lead lines, the tuning is dramatically lowered (from C# Standard seen on Demons to Drop A#), and is contrasted with Shutt's more visceral rhythm technique and riffs.  Tomas Morgan's vocals lean far more towards deathcore, with lower vocal pitches for significant portions of the song. The band also adopted aggression wherever possible, i.e. being encouraged in studio to purposely hit rim shot drum strokes instead of clean drum strokes, and using only active pickups on all guitars.  Despite this, this is the first venture to feature clean vocals since the band's early demo EP "No Place Like Home" (this is excluding the guest clean vocals on the title track of Demons), sung by drummer Gary Holley.  This is something the band states was not planned, and was an impromptu idea that ended up being included in the final mix.

Glass was originally seen by the band as a somewhat experimental bridge between Demons and their 2nd EP (which is currently being written,) rather than a confirmed introduction to the type of sound that might appear on their next EP in 2016. However, 6 months after this release From Her Eyes amicably disbanded, shelving plans for a follow up record.

The band released a music video of Glass on 21 September 2015, produced by Storm + Shelter.

Track listing

Personnel

From Her Eyes 

 Tomas Morgan - Lead Vocals 
 James Kearle - Lead Guitars
 Joseph Shutt - Rhythm Guitars
 Jesse Simmonds - Bass Guitar
 Gary Holley - Drums, Clean Vocals

Additional personnel 

 Stu McKay (Studio 6) - Recording, Engineering, Mixing & Mastering
 Set Sail Studios - Album Artwork

Trivia 
 Joe Shutt is a left-handed guitarist, but due to technical issues whilst recording, Joe Shutt recorded all rhythm parts on a right handed guitar upside down to avoid time constraints. 
 Glass is a subtle sequel to Porcelain, based on the Demons EP

References

2015 singles
From Her Eyes songs
2015 songs